Smithfield High School is a public high school located in Smithfield, Virginia in Isle of Wight County, south of Newport News and the James River. It is part of the Isle of Wight County Public Schools and graduated its first class in 1906. The school's current facility opened in 1980. Athletic teams compete in the Virginia High School League's AA Bay Rivers District in Region I. Smithfield High School is also fully accredited school by the Virginia Board of Education and is also part of the program 'No Child Left Behind.'

History
Prior to the integration of public schools in 1968, only white students attended Smithfield High. From 1928 to 1968, black students were educated at Isle of Wight Training School, which was renamed Westside High School in 1960. Most of Smithfield High's original facility was razed in the 1990s, however its gymnasium remains intact and was mildly remodeled to become part of the Luter Family YMCA in 1995 located on James Street in downtown Smithfield.  The Smithfield Public Library now sits where the original high school's classrooms once stood.

Notable Achievements

 The debate team won the 2016, 2017, 2018, and 2019 Virginia High School League 4A State Championship 
 ARMY JROTC, won 1st place at state competitions in 2010, and holds the Honor Unit w/ distinction award.
 The wrestling team won District/Conference titles in 2009 & 2014, 2015, 2016, 2017.

The Boys Varsity Basketball team won the 2021 Class 4 State Championship
The Boys Varsity Soccer team won the 2021 Class 4 State Championship

Growth and Enrollment
Enrollment has grown substantially over the last 20 years.  Graduating classes averaged around 100 students in the 1980s, and averaged 125 in the early 1990s.  By 2007, the graduating classes had exceeded 250.

Feeder Patterns
The following schools feed students into Smithfield High School:

Carrollton Elementary, PreK - 3rd.

Hardy Elementary, PreK - 4th

Westside Elementary, 4th (Carrollton ES) - 6th.

Smithfield Middle School, 7th - 8th.

References

External links
Smithfield High School

Schools in Isle of Wight County, Virginia
Public high schools in Virginia
Educational institutions established in 1906
1906 establishments in Virginia